Allapur is a town and a nagar panchayat in Badaun district  in the state of Uttar Pradesh, India.

Demographics
As of the 2001 Census of India, Alapur had a population of 20,725. Males constitute 53% of the population and females 47%. Allapur has an average literacy rate of 35%, lower than the national average of 59.5%; with 67% of the males and 33% of females literate. 21% of the population is under 6 years of age.

References

Cities and towns in Budaun district